In 2012 Åtvidabergs FF will compete in Allsvenskan and Svenska Cupen.

2012 season squad
Statistics prior to season start only

Transfers

In

Out

Appearances and goals
As of 17 July 2012

|}

Matches

Pre-season/friendlies

Allsvenskan

Competitions

Allsvenskan

Standings

Results summary

Results by round

Season statistics

Superettan

= Number of bookings
 = Number of sending offs after a second yellow card
= Number of sending offs by a direct red card

Svenska cupen

References
Footnotes

References

External links
 Åtvidabergs FF homepage
 SvFF homepage

Åtvidabergs FF seasons
Atvidaberg